The World Heritage Rock Art Centre - Alta Museum (Verdensarvsenter for bergkunst – Alta Museum) is located at Alta in Troms og Finnmark, Norway.

World Heritage Rock Art - Alta Museum is situated in Hjemmeluft, a small bay in the Altafjord at a site of early settlement of Finnmark dating from around 11,000 years ago. In 1973, the first rock carvings in Hjemmeluft were found. To date over 3,000 figures have been registered here. In the municipality as a whole over 6000 figures have been registered.

The museum opened in June 1991 and won the European Museum of the Year Award in 1993. Alta Museum is northern Norway's most-visited summer museum, with more than 1,000 visitors each day. It is the second most visited attraction in Finnmark County. It presents exhibitions on local culture and historic industries including the nearby prehistoric rock carvings that form a UNESCO World Heritage Site.

References

External links 
Alta Museum website
Altarockart.no
Rock Art of Alta	

Museums established in 1991
Local museums in Norway
Museums in Troms og Finnmark
History museums in Norway
Industry museums in Norway
Open-air museums in Norway
Alta, Norway
Rock art in Europe
1991 establishments in Norway